The 1999 European Grand Prix (formally the 1999 Warsteiner Grand Prix of Europe) was a Formula One motor race held on 26 September 1999 at the Nürburgring in Nürburg, Germany. It was the fourteenth race of the 1999 FIA Formula One World Championship. The 66-lap race was won by Johnny Herbert, driving a Stewart-Ford, with Jarno Trulli second in a Prost-Peugeot and Herbert's teammate Rubens Barrichello third.

It was considered to be one of the most eventful and exciting races of the 1999 season. Going into the race Mika Häkkinen, Eddie Irvine, Heinz-Harald Frentzen and David Coulthard were all harbouring World Championship aspirations. Häkkinen and Irvine were tied for the points lead, with Frentzen 10 points behind them and Coulthard a further two points back. In the previous round at Monza, Häkkinen had made an unforced error while leading, Coulthard and Irvine finished only 5th and 6th and Frentzen took his second race win of the season. 

In the race, a high number of retirements saw Marc Gené take 6th place for the Minardi team, their first points since Pedro Lamy's at the 1995 Australian Grand Prix. The Stewart cars took first and third, with Prost's Jarno Trulli finishing second. As a consequence of the race, Häkkinen moved into the lead in the World Drivers' Championship, two points ahead of Irvine, with Frentzen a further twelve behind. In the World Constructors Championship, McLaren extended their lead to twelve points over Ferrari. It would prove to be Johnny Herbert's 3rd and final F1 victory, also his 7th and final podium in what was the only victory for the Stewart Grand Prix team as well as their only double podium.

This would be the last time until the 2003 Brazilian Grand Prix that both Ferraris in the race would fail to score points, and also the last time until the 2003 Australian Grand Prix that neither Ferrari driver finished on the podium.

Report

Background
Heading into the race, McLaren driver Mika Häkkinen and Ferrari driver Eddie Irvine were tied for the lead of the World Drivers' Championship on 60 points each. Jordan driver Heinz-Harald Frentzen was third on 50, followed by Häkkinen's team-mate David Coulthard on 48. In the Constructors' Championship, McLaren led Ferrari by six points, 108 to 102, with Jordan third on 57.

Following the Italian Grand Prix on 12 September, four teams (McLaren, Williams, Jordan, Stewart) conducted testing sessions at the Magny-Cours circuit on 14–16 September. Coulthard set the fastest time on all three days of testing. Williams, Jordan and Stewart ran for only two days at Magny-Cours. Ferrari ran their pairing Irvine and Mika Salo at the team's test circuit of Mugello. Ferrari test driver and Minardi driver Luca Badoer performed engine development work at their test track at Fiorano with Irvine performing shakedown runs. Benetton performed aerodynamic mapping tests at RAF Kemble with Arrows and Minardi electing not to test.

Practice and qualifying
Two practice sessions were held before the Sunday race—one on Friday from 11:00 to 14:00 local time, and a second on Saturday morning between 09:00 and 11:00. The first practice session took place in dry conditions.

Saturday afternoon's qualifying session was held from 13:00 to 14:00 local time. Each driver was limited to twelve laps with the implementation of a 107% rule to exclude slow drivers from competing in the Sunday race. The session was held on a wet track – the result of previous rainfall with isolated showers a few hours before qualifying. Frentzen clinched second pole position of his career, in his Jordan 199, with a time of 1:19.910. Although he was dissatisfied with earlier problems finding the ideal setup during practice—he said that he felt fantastic to be on pole position—he believed he could have made a faster lap, as he was carrying five laps worth of fuel on board. Frentzen was joined on the front row by Coulthard who was two-tenths of a second slower.

Race
On race day the track was dry but the start was delayed when Alessandro Zanardi and Marc Gené lined up out of sequence on the grid, necessitating another formation lap. As the start was aborted during the start lights' sequence, the top five qualifiers and Jean Alesi actually jumped the start but were not penalised due to the aborting of the start. When the race finally got under way, Frentzen led from Häkkinen, but further back there was trouble at the first corner. Damon Hill's Jordan suffered an electrical failure in the middle of the pack which caused Alexander Wurz to swerve into Pedro Diniz, sending the Sauber into a barrel roll. The safety car was deployed while Diniz was helped uninjured from his car – a fortunate end result as it was later revealed that the Sauber's rollbar had failed when it hit the ground.

The race settled down with the top six Frentzen, Häkkinen, Coulthard, Ralf Schumacher, Giancarlo Fisichella, and Irvine. On lap 17, Irvine passed Fisichella after pressuring the Italian into running wide at turn 8. Whilst further back Zanardi was an unfortunate victim to the collision between Diniz and Wurz as his car was damaged from this incident earlier on and would eventually retire on lap 11 when his Supertec engine stalled. Just moments later the rain began to fall and Ralf Schumacher took advantage of the damp track to pass Coulthard. At the end of lap 20, Häkkinen pitted for wet tyres, which proved to be premature as the rain quickly blew over and the track dried. The following lap Irvine pitted for dry tyres but the stop lasted 28 seconds with the right-rear mechanics seemingly confused over a last minute change in tyre choice. Team mate Mika Salo had damaged his wing the previous lap leaving the Ferrari pitcrew unprepared for Irvine. On lap 24, Häkkinen on wet tyres was lapping around seven seconds slower than the leaders and was overtaken by Irvine over the start-finish straight dropping to 13th position. Soon afterwards, with his tyres clearly overheating, Häkkinen pitted again to change back to dry tyres emerging just in front of Fisichella, who was a full lap ahead of him.

Ralf Schumacher pitted from 2nd position at the end of lap 27 for his scheduled first stop leaving Frentzen and Coulthard battling at the front followed by Fisichella twelve seconds behind the leaders in 3rd place. At the end of lap 32 both Frentzen and Coulthard pitted for their first scheduled stops with both Jordan and McLaren mechanics impeccably turning their cars around in 7 seconds, and both returning comfortably ahead of Schumacher. At this point in the race both Irvine and Häkkinen were well out of the points, meaning that if the order stayed the same Frentzen, Irvine, and Häkkinen would have all been tied for the points lead with two races to go, with Coulthard six points behind them.

What followed was a series of retirements. The first to fall was Frentzen, who ground to a halt at the first corner after his pitstop because he had forgotten to disable the car's anti-stall system. The team claimed it was an "electrical issue" in order to protect Frentzen. Coulthard inherited the lead and stayed out front until the rain came back with a vengeance. The Scot chose to stay out on dry tyres while most pitted for wets, which ultimately proved to be a costly mistake, as he slid off the road and out of the race on the 38th lap as the conditions worsened. Within a handful of laps two Championship contenders had seen their hopes of winning the title fall by the wayside. Ralf (still on dry tyres) then inherited the lead which he held until his pitstop six laps later. This allowed Fisichella (also on dry tyres) to take the lead with Ralf in second, as the rain stopped. Meanwhile, Johnny Herbert had quietly moved up the order after changing to wet tyres just at the right time. Mika Salo would soon be forced to retire with brake problems.

The heartbreak then reached new levels. On lap 49, Fisichella spun out of the lead like Coulthard before him leaving him like Coulthard (emotionally distressed), giving the lead back to Ralf. But then Ralf too lost the lead (and probable first win) when his right rear tyre punctured, allowing Herbert to take the lead which he would not lose. Further back the Minardis were taking full advantage of the unpredictable nature of the race with Luca Badoer in fourth and Gené in seventh. But with just 13 laps to go, Badoer's gearbox failed, denying the Ferrari test driver his first ever Formula 1 points and leaving him in tears. Gené was promoted to 6th, which became 5th when Jacques Villeneuve's car failed with a broken clutch, robbing the BAR team of a chance to get their first-ever point before . Behind him, Irvine and Häkkinen had fought their way back into contention for points, with Irvine holding 6th ahead of Häkkinen. After cruising for most of the race, Häkkinen turned up the pressure, eventually forcing Irvine into a mistake and taking 6th place. At the front Barrichello tried everything to pass Jarno Trulli for 2nd and make it a Stewart 1–2, but ultimately had to settle for 3rd. Meanwhile, Häkkinen caught and passed Gené for 5th to earn 2 invaluable points, but the Spaniard held onto 6th ahead of Irvine to give Minardi their first point in four seasons.

Post-race
It was the only race ever won by the Stewart Grand Prix team, as well as being the only time Stewart had two drivers finish on the podium. It was also first Grand Prix victory for Ford engine since the 1994 European Grand Prix, the last Grand Prix victory for Johnny Herbert, the last podium finish for the Prost Grand Prix team and also last-ever Formula 1 podium finish for the Peugeot engine, . Jackie Stewart considered the race greater than any of his own race wins. This was the final time that both Ferrari cars failed to score until the 2003 Brazilian Grand Prix.

Gené's performance, in finishing 6th ahead of championship contender Irvine, is considered by many as the deciding factor in the Drivers' Championship, for it is often believed that had Irvine passed Gené for sixth, he would have had the extra point to win the title (with Schumacher letting Irvine pass him during the race in Japan).

Classification

Qualifying

Race

Championship standings after the race
Bold text indicates who still has a theoretical chance of becoming World Champion.

Drivers' Championship standings

Constructors' Championship standings

References 

European Grand Prix
European Grand Prix
European Grand Prix
September 1999 sports events in Europe